Daniel Quasar is an American artist and graphic designer, known for their design of the Progress Pride flag, a variation of the rainbow pride flag that incorporates additional colors to explicitly represent trans people and LGBTQ+ communities of color.

Career 

Quasar graduated with a BFA in Communication Design from Pacific Northwest College of Art. During the degree program, they were involved in the local drag community. Their design career has since included animations and graphics for RuPaul's Drag Race world tours, as well work with Drag Race winner Jinkx Monsoon.

In 2018, Quasar re-designed the existing rainbow flag to incorporate the transgender flag, as well as black and brown stripes to represent LGBTQ+ communities of color "as well as those living with AIDS, those no longer living, and the stigma surrounding them". The additional colors were added in a chevron shape along the hoist to represent forward movement. They began a crowdfunding campaign to fund the first production of the flags. In 2021, Deliveroo adopted the progress pride flag for Pride Month. The flag is flown in many international cities above official buildings, including New York City, London, Boston, and Sydney.

As of 2021 Quasar resided in Portland, Oregon.

Notes

References

External links 

 Official website

Living people
Year of birth missing (living people)
American graphic designers
Non-binary artists
Non-binary musicians
Non-binary activists
Flag designers
21st-century LGBT people